(English: Merry Sunday for the youth) was an Argentine television game show. It was aired from 1970 to 1999 by Canal 9. In this show a number of teams of high-school students sought a free trip to San Carlos de Bariloche to celebrate their graduation. 

Argentine game shows
Argentine variety television shows
El Nueve original programming
1970s game shows
1980s game shows
1990s game shows